Club Internacional de Fútbol Miami, known as Inter Miami CF or simply Inter Miami, is an American professional soccer club based in the Miami metropolitan area. Established in 2018, the club began to play in Major League Soccer (MLS) in the 2020 season. The club currently plays its home MLS matches at DRV PNK Stadium, the site of the former Lockhart Stadium in nearby Fort Lauderdale, Florida.

History
In November 2012, MLS commissioner Don Garber confirmed the league's renewed interest in placing an expansion franchise in Miami, after the Miami Fusion folded following the 2001 season and an expansion bid led by Miami-based Bolivian telecom entrepreneur Marcelo Claure and FC Barcelona failed in 2009.

When David Beckham, who had received an option to purchase an expansion team at a price of $25 million when he joined the league in 2007, ended his playing career in April 2013, the league held preliminary discussions with Beckham's advisers about several expansion targets, including Miami. That same year, other investors, including Italian financier Alessandro Butini and Miami Dolphins owner Stephen M. Ross expressed interest in owning a Miami franchise as well.

In his December 2013 State of the League address, Garber identified Beckham and Simon Fuller as potential owners in Miami. Later that month, on December 17, Miami-Dade County commissioners voted unanimously to allow Mayor Carlos A. Giménez to negotiate with the Beckham-led group on a new stadium in downtown Miami.
The league announced that Beckham exercised his option on February 5, 2014, and that Miami Beckham United, the investment group led by Beckham, Fuller and Claure, would own an expansion franchise in Miami, assuming that financing for a stadium could be agreed upon. In presentations to officials and potential investors, the ownership group used "Miami Vice" and "Miami Current" as working titles for the club. After its initial stadium proposals fell through, Commissioner Garber reiterated in August 2014 that the expansion would not be approved until a downtown stadium plan was secured. Beckham bought Fuller out in May 2019.

On January 29, 2018, the Miami Beckham United group, four years after the ownership's original announcement of pursuing a team, was awarded the twenty-fifth MLS franchise and was set to launch in the 2020 season. The announcement represented part of a larger MLS expansion that would increase its number of teams to 26 by 2020 and 30 after that. Since Beckham's original announcement of his intention to place a team in Miami in 2014, Orlando City, New York City FC, Atlanta United, Minnesota United, Los Angeles FC, and FC Cincinnati have all begun MLS play. Paul McDonough was hired as sporting director effective August 4.

The team's ownership now operates through Miami Freedom Park LLC. Some graphics used by the group have evoked the Freedom Tower, a city landmark.

Club Internacional de Fútbol Miami, or Inter Miami CF for short, was announced as the club's name on September 5, 2018.

On December 30, 2019, former Uruguay national team player and C.F. Monterrey manager Diego Alonso was announced as the club's inaugural head coach.

Inter Miami's first MLS game was played on March 1, 2020, losing 1–0, away to Los Angeles FC. Designated Player Rodolfo Pizarro scored the first goal in Inter Miami history the following game on March 7, in a 2–1 loss to D.C. United. Their first home match was supposed to be on March 14, 2020, against LA Galaxy, Beckham's former club. The match has since been delayed due to the COVID-19 pandemic. On August 23, 2020, Inter Miami recorded their first franchise victory, 3–2 over Orlando City. On January 18, 2021, England Women's manager Phil Neville was appointed as the new head coach, and Seattle Sounders FC's Chris Henderson as chief soccer officer and sporting director.

On May 28, 2021, MLS announced that it would sanction Inter Miami CF, owner Jorge Mas, and former sporting director Paul McDonough for violating roster rules during the 2020 season. The club had signed Blaise Matuidi and Andrés Reyes using targeted allocation money (TAM) to comply with salary cap requirements and avoid using its three Designated Player slots, but were found to have exceeded the TAM maximum of $1.61 million per player. MLS fined the club $2 million and reduced its allocation dollars by $2.27 million for the 2022 and 2023 seasons, while Mas was fined $250,000 and McDonough was suspended from league activities through the end of the 2022 season. Prior to the announcement, Matuidi was reclassified as a Designated Player by taking the slot occupied by Matías Pellegrini, who was loaned to Fort Lauderdale CF after his contract was bought out by the club.

Colors and badge
The Miami Beckham United group unveiled the team's name and colors on September 5, 2018. The name was announced as Club Internacional de Fútbol Miami (Inter Miami CF). The crest, designed in style and colors that recall the city's Art Deco architectural tradition, displays two great white herons with interlocking legs forming a letter M. Between the herons is an eclipse, the sun bearing seven rays in an homage to the number Beckham often wore as a player.  The team colors are pink, black and white and it is the only major professional sports team in North America that has pink as a team color. The full achievement displays the team name encircling all with the Roman numerals MMXX representing the year 2020, the inaugural season of play.

The species of the birds in the crest was the subject of debate after its announcement and unveiling, with some speculating them to be flamingos and egrets. The team later announced that the birds are white herons.

The club's name has been the subject of a trademark dispute with Italian club Inter Milan, which had filed a claim with the U.S. Patent and Trademark Office for the protected use of "Inter" in 2014. MLS filed an objection to the trademark claim in April 2019, arguing that the name "Inter" was generic due to its use by other clubs and could not be claimed exclusively. , the case  continues.

Stadium

Miami Freedom Park

In March 2020, Inter Miami began to play in Fort Lauderdale. They will continue to do so until their new stadium, to be known as Miami Freedom Park, is completed. The current proposal is for a 25,000-seat stadium that would form part of Freedom Park, a mixed-use complex on the present site of the city-owned Melreese Country Club near the Miami International Airport. Approval for construction of the stadium depended on the outcome of a public referendum held on November 6, 2018. The result of the referendum had roughly 60 percent of voters approving the measure to convert the city-owned golf course near the international airport into Inter Miami CF's new stadium, Miami Freedom Park.

The proposed development, to be built on  public land, will include  of office, retail and commercial space, 750 hotel rooms,  of public soccer fields in addition to the  stadium, and the remaining  will be a public park. The owners will also make annual installments of $20 million for 30 years for improvements to public parks across the city. The agreement still requires the approval of a four-vote supermajority of the five City of Miami commissioners. The plan had faced opposition from supporters of the golf club and many details, such as fiscal responsibility for toxic incinerator ash in the soil, remain to be worked out.

The decision follows a lengthy exploration of options. Some locations that had previously been considered included: Dodge Island at PortMiami (2013), the Downtown Miami waterfront at Museum Park (2014), a site adjacent to MLB's Marlins Park (2015), and a privately owned site in Miami's Overtown (2015–16). The team also considered the Riccardo Silva Stadium at Florida International University.

DRV PNK Stadium

DRV PNK Stadium is a soccer stadium  in Fort Lauderdale, Florida on the site of the former Lockhart Stadium. The stadium is oriented north–south for soccer configuration, so the sun won't be in the eyes of the goalie. The stadium is the primary headquarters for the team and its youth academy in addition to further training grounds.

The Fort Lauderdale Strikers announced in 2016 that they were moving out of Lockhart Stadium, after which the stadium fell into a state of disrepair. In late January 2019, Inter Miami announced its intentions to pursue the Lockhart Stadium site to serve as the club's training ground for its first team, USL League One reserve team Fort Lauderdale CF, and youth academy. The development would also include an 18,000-seat stadium, which will serve as the permanent home of Fort Lauderdale CF and as the interim home for Inter Miami for at least the first two seasons while the Miami Freedom Park stadium is under construction. The Fort Lauderdale city council unanimously approved Inter Miami's bid for the Lockhart Stadium site in March 2019. In April, the Fort Lauderdale City Commission cleared Inter Miami to begin the demolition process. On July 9, 2019, the Fort Lauderdale City Commission unanimously approved a 50-year lease agreement for the Lockhart Stadium site with Inter Miami; under the terms of the agreement, the city will retain ownership of the property while the soccer club will be responsible for the construction, operation, and maintenance of the new facilities.

Training complex
In late January 2019, the club announced its intentions to pursue the Lockhart Stadium site in Fort Lauderdale to serve as the club's training ground for its first team, youth academy, and future United Soccer League (USL) team.

Upon completion, the complex is used as the permanent training facilities for all levels of Inter Miami's teams ranging from their Youth Academy teams and USL League One team to the first team that plays in MLS.

Ownership
The ownership group behind the franchise was first formed in 2013 as Miami Beckham United, though it now trades under the name Miami Freedom Park LLC. The original ownership group was led by Miami-based Bolivian businessman Marcelo Claure, while Masayoshi Son and brothers Jorge and Jose Mas were added to the ownership group in 2017. The effort originated in a contract David Beckham signed with MLS in 2007; he joined LA Galaxy and negotiated an option to own an expansion team at a discounted franchise fee.

On September 17, 2021, it was announced that Beckham and the Mas brothers had bought out Claure and Son's stakes in the ownership group. Ares Management was also added to the ownership group.

Supporters
The club has four official supporters groups: Nación Rosa Y Negro, The Siege, Southern Legion, and Vice City 1896.

Rivalries

The club has an interstate rivalry with Orlando City SC, currently the team's closest neighbors and only other Florida-based team in MLS. Orlando City joined MLS in 2015 but had to wait until its sixth season to play a first interstate match against an MLS opponent following the introduction of Inter Miami as an expansion franchise in 2020. Unlike a lot of rivalries in Major League Soccer, there is no name for this series although several have been mooted to little to no success.

Players and staff

Squad

Out on loan

Technical staff

Head coaches

Records

Seasons 

This is a partial list of the last five seasons completed by Inter Miami. For the full season-by-season history, see List of Inter Miami CF seasons.

1. Avg. attendance include statistics from league matches only.
2. Top goalscorer(s) includes all goals scored in League, MLS Cup Playoffs, U.S. Open Cup, MLS is Back Tournament, CONCACAF Champions League, FIFA Club World Cup, and other competitive continental matches.

Infrastructure

Reserve team 

On October 9, 2019, the club announced that they will be fielding a reserve team in the third tier of US Soccer, USL League One. This team allows the club to prepare future players with quality competition in hopes of being called up to the first team. The unnamed League One Miami team will train at the training facilities of Inter Miami CF Stadium.

The team was to open their inaugural season on March 27, 2020, against Union Omaha at Inter Miami CF Stadium but the match was postponed due to the COVID-19 pandemic.

On February 24, 2022, Fort Lauderdale CF announced that the team had rebranded as Inter Miami CF II ahead of their move to the MLS Next Pro, the new reserve league for MLS teams.

Academy 
The Inter Miami CF Academy is the official youth academy and development system of Inter Miami CF that was established in 2019. The academy consists of various levels of age groups, ranging from U-12 to U-17. These teams will also train at the training grounds in Inter Miami CF Stadium alongside their MLS and USL League One counterparts. All of Inter Miami's youth teams compete in the MLS Next soccer league as of the inaugural 2022 season. The system covers the under-12, under-13, under-14, under-15, and under-17 age groups.

Media 
The team's first three matches in the 2020 season were assigned to national broadcasts; a broadcast deal was not announced before the suspension of play due to the COVID-19 pandemic, but the team did announce that Ray Hudson will serve as color commentator, Andres Cordero will serve as the play-by-play commentator, joined by Fernando Fiore as the host, and Kaylyn Kyle as the sideline reporter. On April 3, 2020, the club announced a regional English-language television deal with CBS Television Stations, under which its regional matches will air on MyNetworkTV affiliate WBFS-TV, with selected matches airing on CBS station WFOR-TV. Then on April 30, the club announced a Spanish rights deal with Univision, where games will be aired on its TV affiliate WAMI and radio affiliate WQBA, with a broadcast team consisting of Ramses Sandoval, Nicholas Cantor and Tony Cherchi.

With every MLS game available on Apple TV via their rights deal in 2023, Inter Miami games will be broadcast almost exclusively on this service, with exceptions for certain national linear television broadcast partners.

References

External links

 
Association football clubs established in 2020
Major League Soccer teams
Soccer clubs in Miami
2020 establishments in Florida